Heino Lill (born on 13 February 1944 in Tartu) is an Estonian basketball coach and former basketballer.

1963-1972 he played for Estonian national basketball team and for BC Tallinna Kalev.

1978-1980 he was a coach of Estonian national basketball team and also of BC Tallinna Kalev. 1990-2001 he was a coach of two Finnish teams: Kuopio and Karkkila.

Since 2001 he is the head of TTÜ Sport Centre.

In 2014 he was awarded with Order of the White Star, V class.

References

Living people
1944 births
Estonian basketball coaches
Estonian men's basketball players
BC Tallinn Kalev players
Recipients of the Order of the White Star, 5th Class
Sportspeople from Tartu